Greco may refer to:

People
 Greco (surname), a list of people with this surname
 a masculine variant of Greca (given name), an Italian feminine given name
 Greco Mafia clan, one of the most influential Mafia clans in Sicily and Calabria

Wine and grapes
 Greco (grape), an Italian grape variety of ancient origins 
 Vino Greco, a generic term for Roman wine made from grapes of Greek origins

Other uses
 Greco (district of Milan)
 Cape Greco, a headland in the island of Cyprus
 Group of States Against Corruption, the Council of Europe's anti-corruption monitoring body
 Greco guitars, a Japanese guitar manufacturer
 Greco Pizza Restaurant, a food chain in Eastern Canada
 Greco Defence, a chess opening
 Greco (Chrono Cross), a playable character from Chrono Cross
 Greco, a character from the 2010 video game James Bond 007: Blood Stone
 a Greek style one-piece swimsuit

See also
 El Greco (disambiguation)
 Greco Player Tracker, a security computer in Ocean's Thirteen movie